Danube River Commission is an international organisation. It may refer to:

  European Commission of the Danube, 1856
 International Danube Commission, 1921
 Danube Commission, 1948

See also

Internationalization of the Danube River, to 1856
 Nazi rule over the Danube River, in  World War II
 Danube River Conference of 1948
 International Commission for the Protection of the Danube River, 1998